John Phillip Devine (born October 3, 1958 in Peru, Indiana) is the Place 4 justice of the nine-member Supreme Court of Texas. A Republican, Devine defeated incumbent David M. Medina in a primary runoff election held on July 31, 2012.  Devine was then elected without a Democratic Party opponent in the general election on November 6, 2012. His term began on January 1, 2013.

Devine graduated in 1980 with a degree in Business Administration and Marketing from Ball State University in Muncie, Indiana. He then joined  Shell Oil in Houston, Texas and studied law at the South Texas College of Law in Downtown Houston. After earning his Juris Doctor degree in 1986, he went to work for Brown and Root.

Before being elected to the state Supreme Court, Devine had served as district judge of the 190th Judicial District Court in Harris County from 1995 through 2002.

When he first ran for district judge in 1994, Devine was unopposed in the Republican primary, and narrowly won the general election, unseating Democratic incumbent, Eileen F. O'Neill, 289,943 (50.5 percent) to 284,246	(49.5 percent).

Devine was re-elected to a second term on the district court bench in 1998, with 261,514 votes (52.8 percent), defeating Democrat Jane Fraser, who polled 233,597 (47.2 percent). Devine did not seek a third term in 2002 and was succeeded by fellow Republican Jennifer F. Elrod, now a judge on the Fifth Circuit Court of Appeals.

From 2003 to 2011, Devine was a special judge to the Harris County Justice of the Peace courts. He also served on the Harris County Juvenile Board, Harris County Juvenile Justice School Board, Board of Civil District Judges, Texas Association of State Judges, and American Judges Association.

In 2004, Devine was sued for his refusal to take down a painting of The Ten Commandments on display in his Harris County courtroom. The case was later dismissed, and the painting remained in the courtroom.

He is married to Nubia Piedad Gomez, formerly of Venezuela.  They had seven children, four boys and three girls.  Their youngest daughter died shortly after birth.

References

1958 births
Living people
Ball State University alumni
South Texas College of Law alumni
Texas Republicans
Businesspeople from Texas
Texas state court judges
Justices of the Texas Supreme Court
People from Houston
People from Austin, Texas
20th-century American judges
21st-century American judges
People from Peru, Indiana